Caribou Ranch Open Space Park is a park located near Nederland, Colorado. It has over 3.14 miles of trail for recreational visitors.  It is open to hikers, horse back riders, and trail runners.  Mountain bikes and dogs are not allowed in the park area.  This park is connected to Mud Lake Open Space Park by the Caribou Ranch Link.  Caribou Ranch is closed April 1 through June 30 to protect spring migratory birds and elk calving and rearing.

History
The park is currently managed by Boulder County Parks and Open Space.  Like many areas in Colorado, it was first occupied by nomadic Native American Tribes.  In the late 1800s the mining industry moved in and established the area.  The Blue Bird Mine Complex was a silver mine from that era and it can still be seen in the park today.  During the summer months, recreational visitors would come to visit the area via the railroad.  In the 1930s, the area was used to breed Arabian horses by Lynn W. Van Vleet.  Then in 1971, the land was purchased and one of the barns was converted into the Caribou Ranch recording studio.

Wildlife
Caribou Ranch Open Space is host to many species of wildlife including elk, migratory birds, black bear, mountain lion, coyote, mule deer, bobcat, bat, moose, beaver, and short tailed weasel.

External links
Boulder County Open Space - Caribou Ranch
Caribou Ranch Update 2002

Parks in Colorado
Protected areas of Boulder County, Colorado